Dawn Gillman (born October 8, 1973) is an American politician serving in the Minnesota House of Representatives since 2023. A member of the Republican Party of Minnesota, Gillman represents District 17A in central Minnesota, which includes the cities of Hutchinson and Glencoe and parts of McLeod, Meeker, Sibley, and Wright Counties.

Early life, education and career 
Gillman attended college at St. Cloud Technical and Community College, earning a dental R.D.A. and C.D.A. Gillman served for 6 years on the Dassel city council.

Minnesota House of Representatives 
Gillman was first elected to the Minnesota House of Representatives in 2022, after the retirement of Republican incumbent Glenn Gruenhagen who decided to run for a seat in the Minnesota Senate. Gillman serves on the Environment and Natural Resources Finance and Policy, Human Services Finance, and Sustainable Infrastructure Policy Committees.

Electoral history

Personal life 
Gillman lives in Dassel, Minnesota with her husband, Brian, and has five children.

References

External links 

Republican Party members of the Minnesota House of Representatives
Living people
1973 births
21st-century American politicians
21st-century American women politicians
Minnesota city council members
People from Meeker County, Minnesota